Grand Prix Mediterrennean WE is a One-day race cycling race, held annually in Turkey. The race is rated 1.2 on the UCI race classifications.

Winners

References

Cycle races in Turkey
Annual sporting events in Turkey
Recurring sporting events established in 2021
UCI Europe Tour races
Women's road bicycle races